The expense ratio of a stock or asset fund is the total percentage of fund assets used for administrative, management, advertising (12b-1), and all other expenses.  An expense ratio of 1% per annum means that each year 1% of the fund's total assets will be used to cover expenses.  The expense ratio does not include sales loads or brokerage commissions.

Expense ratios are important to consider when choosing a fund, as they can significantly affect returns.  Factors influencing the expense ratio include the size of the fund (small funds often have higher ratios as they spread expenses among a smaller number of investors), sales charges, and the management style of the fund.  A typical annual expense ratio for a U.S. domestic stock fund is about 1%, although some passively managed funds (such as index funds) have significantly lower ratios.

One notable component of the expense ratio of U.S. funds is the "12b-1 fee", which represents expenses used for advertising and promotion of the fund.  12b-1 fees are generally limited to a maximum of 1.00% per year (.75% distribution and .25% shareholder servicing) under Financial Industry Regulatory Authority Rules.

The term "expense ratio" is also a key measure of performance for a nonprofit organization.  The term is sometimes used in other contexts as well.

Waivers, reimbursements and recoupments
Some funds will execute "waiver or reimbursement agreements" with the fund's adviser or other service providers, especially when a fund is new and expenses tend to be higher (due to a small asset base).  These agreements generally reduce expenses to some pre-determined level or by some pre-determined amount.  Sometimes, these waiver/reimbursement amounts must be repaid by the fund during a period that generally cannot exceed 3 years from the year in which the original expense was incurred.  If a recoupment plan is in effect, the effect may be to require future shareholders to absorb expenses of the fund incurred during prior years. It is calculated by operating expenses.

Changes in expense ratio (fixed and variable expenses)
Generally, unlike future performance, expenses are predictable. Funds with high expense ratios tend to continue to have high expense ratios. An investor can examine a fund's "Financial Highlights" which is contained in both the periodic financial reports and the fund's prospectus, and determine a fund's expense ratio over the last five years (if the fund has five years of history). It is very hard for a fund to significantly lower its expense ratio once it has had a few years of operational history.

This is because funds have both fixed and variable expenses, but most expenses are variable.  Variable costs are fixed on a percentage basis. For example, assuming there are no breakpoints, a .75% management fee will always consume .75% of fund assets, regardless of any increase in assets under management. The total management fee will vary based on the assets under management, but it will always be .75% of assets.

Fixed costs (such as rent or an audit fee) vary on a percentage basis because the lump sum rent/audit amount as a percentage will vary depending on the amount of assets a fund has acquired. Thus, most of a fund's expenses behave as a variable expense and thus, are a constant fixed percentage of fund assets. It is, therefore, very hard for a fund to significantly reduce its expense ratio after it has some history. Thus, if an investor buys a fund with a high expense ratio that has some history, he/she should not expect any significant reduction.

Expenses matter relative to investment type
There are three broad investment categories for mutual funds (equity, bond, and money market – in declining order of historical returns).  This is an over-simplification, but is adequate to explain the effect of expenses.  In an equity fund where the historical gross return might be 9%, a 1% expense ratio will consume approximately 11% of the investor's return (1 divided by 9 is about 0.11 or 11%). In a bond fund where the historical gross return might be 8%, a 1% expense ratio will consume approximately 12.5% of the investor's return.  In a money market fund where the historical gross return might be 5%, a 1% expense ratio will consume approximately 20% of the investor's historical total return.  Thus, an investor must consider a fund's expense ratio as it relates to the type of investments a fund will hold.

Nonprofit organizations
In nonprofit organizations, the term "program expense ratio" refers to program expenses divided by total expenses. This is one of the primary financial indicators of concern to charities and their donors.  The sum of the program expense ratio and the "support service expense ratio" is by definition 100% for a non-profit organization.  Charities having a higher program expense ratio (and thus a lower support service expense ratio) are often considered to be more efficient.

The support service expense ratio is also commonly called the "overhead".  Leading sources of information about charities, including GuideStar, Charity Navigator and the Wise Giving Alliance, say that the support service expense ratio (i.e. "overhead") can be an important indicator, especially if it is at one extreme or another, but generally speaking it is just as important to look at other factors including transparency, governance, leadership, and results.

According to Charity Navigator (as of 2009), the national median for the support service expense ratio was 10 percent, and that expense ratio was less than 30 percent for more than three-fourths of the charities ranked on its website.

Other uses
The term is also widely used among finance and accounting professionals to demonstrate the profitability and viability of the operations of a business.  In this context, the expense ratio shows the percentage of an operation's gross revenues that is being allocated to the expenses related to running the operation.  Business managers who use profit and loss statements (i.e. income statements) to draft business plans find expense ratios to be very useful indices in producing forecasts, and determining where cost cutting and revenue maximization opportunities exist.

See also
 Operating expense
 Total expense ratio

References

Expense
Financial ratios